In cryptography, a proof of knowledge is an interactive proof in which the prover succeeds in 'convincing' a verifier that the prover knows something. What it means for a machine to 'know something' is defined in terms of computation. A machine 'knows something', if this something can be computed, given the machine as an input. As the program of the prover does not necessarily spit out the knowledge itself (as is the case for zero-knowledge proofs) a machine with a different program, called the knowledge extractor is introduced to capture this idea. We are mostly interested in what can be proven by polynomial time bounded machines. In this case the set of knowledge elements is limited to a set of witnesses of some language in NP.

Let  be a statement of language  in NP, and  the set of witnesses for x that should be accepted in the proof. This allows us to define the following relation: .

A proof of knowledge for relation  with knowledge error  is a two
party protocol with a prover  and a verifier  with the following two properties:

 Completeness: If , then the prover  who knows witness  for  succeeds in convincing the verifier  of his knowledge. More formally: , i.e. given the interaction between the prover P and the verifier V, the probability that the verifier is convinced is 1.
 Validity: Validity requires that the success probability of a knowledge extractor  in extracting the witness, given oracle access to a possibly malicious prover , must be at least as high as the success probability of the prover  in convincing the verifier. This property guarantees that no prover that doesn't know the witness can succeed in convincing the verifier.

Details on the definition

This is a more rigorous definition of Validity:

Let  be a witness relation,  the set of all witnesses for public value , and  the knowledge error.

The result  signifies that the Turing machine  did not come to a conclusion.

The knowledge error  denotes the probability that the verifier  might accept , even though the prover does in fact not know a witness . The knowledge extractor  is used to express what is meant by the knowledge of a Turing machine.

This definition of the validity property is a combination of the validity and strong validity properties. For small knowledge errors , such as e.g.  or  it can be seen as being stronger than the soundness of ordinary interactive proofs.

Relation to general interactive proofs

In order to define a specific proof of knowledge, one need not only define the language, but also the witnesses the verifier should know. In some cases proving membership in a language may be easy, while computing a specific witness may be hard. This is best explained using an example:

Let  be a cyclic group with generator  in which solving the discrete logarithm problem is believed to be hard. However, finding the witness  such that  holds corresponds to solving the discrete logarithm problem.

Protocols

Schnorr protocol

One of the simplest and frequently used proofs of knowledge, the proof of knowledge of a discrete logarithm, is due to Schnorr. The protocol is defined for a cyclic group  of order  with generator .

 In the first round the prover commits himself to randomness ; therefore the first message  is also called commitment. 
 The verifier replies with a challenge  chosen at random.
 After receiving , the prover sends the third and last message (the response)  reduced modulo the order of the group.

The verifier accepts, if .

We can see this is a valid proof of knowledge because it has an extractor that works as follows:

 Simulate the prover to output . The prover is now in state .
 Generate random value  and input it to the prover. It outputs .
 Rewind the prover to state . Now generate a different random value  and input it to the prover to get .
 Output .

Since , the output of the extractor is precisely .

This protocol happens to be zero-knowledge, though that property is not required for a proof of knowledge.

Sigma protocols

Protocols which have the above three-move structure (commitment, challenge and response) are called sigma protocols. The Greek letter  visualizes the flow of the protocol. Sigma protocols exist for proving various statements, such as those pertaining to discrete logarithms. Using these proofs, the prover can not only prove the knowledge of the discrete logarithm, but also that the discrete logarithm is of a specific form. Equality corresponds to the special case where a = 1 and b = 0. As  can be trivially computed from  this is equivalent to proving knowledge of an x such that .

This is the intuition behind the following notation, which is commonly used to express what exactly is proven by a proof of knowledge.

 

states that the prover knows an x that fulfills the relation above.

Applications

Proofs of knowledge are useful tool for the construction of identification protocols, and in their non-interactive variant, signature schemes. Such schemes are:

 Schnorr signature

They are also used in the construction of group signature and anonymous digital credential systems.

See also
 Cryptographic protocol
 Zero-knowledge proof
 Interactive proof system
 Topics in cryptography
 Zero-knowledge password proof
 Soundness (interactive proof)

References

Computational complexity theory
Cryptography